East Manchester may refer to:
 East Manchester Township, York County, Pennsylvania, United States
 East Manchester, in Manchester, England
 East Manchester Line
 The East Manchester Academy